Patrick Kelsey (born May 15, 1975) is an American college basketball coach. He is the current head men's basketball coach at the College of Charleston.

Playing career 
Kelsey played high school basketball at Roger Bacon High School in Cincinnati, OH. He transferred to Elder High School for his senior year and in 1993 helped lead the team to a Division I state title. Kelsey began his collegiate career as a freshman guard at the University of Wyoming. He transferred to Xavier in 1994 where he played three seasons.

Coaching career 
Kelsey began his career as an assistant coach at Wake Forest University and later Xavier University. During his time as an assistant coach, his teams earned an ACC regular season championship, five NCAA Tournament berths, an NIT berth, and a No. 1 national ranking in two different seasons. In 2010, College Bound Hoops ranked Kelsey eighth in the nation among college basketball assistants. He was sought after by some of America's top programs and has been a candidate for multiple head coaching positions. Chris Mack, former A-10 and Big East Championship head coach, considered him to be one of the best assistant coaches in America.

As head coach at Winthrop University, Kelsey resurrected a winning tradition and became one of the winningest coaches in the history of the Big South Conference (ranked 2nd all-time with 110 conference wins). During his nine seasons, no other Big South program had more conference wins or wins overall. The program made four straight Big South Conference tournament title games (2014–17) and the Eagles claimed the 2017, 2020, and 2021 Big South Conference Championships. The 2017 team claimed a share of the Big South regular season championship and then defeated Campbell University to earn Winthrop’s 10th trip to the NCAA Tournament. In 2020, the team secured the Big South regular season championship and defeated Hampton University in the conference championship game to earn what would have been Winthrop's 11th trip to the NCAA tournament. However, the 2020 NCAA tournament was cancelled due to the COVID-19 pandemic. In 2021, the Eagles started the season 16–0 and had a cumulative 21-game winning streak dating back to the prior season, which were both program records. They defeated Campbell in the conference tournament to earn their 11th NCAA Tournament bid. Following the season, Kelsey was named a finalist for the Jim Phelan Award (national coach of the year) and the Skip Prosser Man of the Year Award.

Under Kelsey, the program broke multiple school records and produced some of the best players in its history, including Keon Johnson, Winthrop's all-time leading scorer, and Xavier Cooks, Winthrop's all time leading rebounder and shot-blocker.

On March 25, 2021, Kelsey announced that he was leaving Winthrop to become head coach at the College of Charleston.

Kelsey has coached a number of players who went on to have successful professional basketball careers, including NBA All-Stars Chris Paul and Jeff Teague. He coached Ish Smith, an All-ACC selection and player for the Houston Rockets, James Johnson, a two-time All-ACC selection and 17th overall draft pick by the Chicago Bulls in the 2009 NBA Draft, and Al-Farouq Aminu, a McDonald's All-America who was drafted eighth overall by the L.A. Clippers in the 2010 NBA Draft.

Newtown speech at Ohio State 
In December 2012, after a game against Ohio State, Kelsey gave an impassioned speech about the Sandy Hook Elementary school shooting that had occurred just days prior. During the game's press conference, Kelsey spoke out about the tragedy and said "Parents, teachers, rabbis, priests, coaches, everybody needs to step up. This has to be a time for change.”

After a clip of the conference aired on ESPN, parents of a victim of the shooting reached out to Kelsey. He later participated in an event (Race4Chase triathlon) put on by the CMAK Sandy Hook Memorial Foundation. The family was honored at an Eagles basketball game on March 1, 2014. At the game, each Winthrop player wore the name of a child killed at Sandy Hook on the back of their jersey.

UMass affair 
In 2017, Kelsey was hired as the head coach at Massachusetts, but returned to Winthrop two days after accepting the position, citing personal reasons. Kelsey informed UMass Athletic Director Ryan Bamford of his decision 25 minutes before the scheduled press conference to formally introduce Kelsey to the press and university community. Two days prior, Kelsey had signed an MoU with the university, which included a $1 million buyout clause should Kelsey leave before two years.

Head coaching record

Awards 

 Big South Men's Basketball Coach of the Year (2020–21)

References

External links
 Winthrop profile

1975 births
Living people
American men's basketball coaches
American men's basketball players
Basketball coaches from Ohio
Basketball players from Cincinnati
College men's basketball head coaches in the United States
Elder High School alumni
High school basketball coaches in Ohio
Point guards
Wake Forest Demon Deacons men's basketball coaches
Winthrop Eagles men's basketball coaches
Wyoming Cowboys basketball players
Xavier Musketeers men's basketball coaches
Xavier Musketeers men's basketball players